"Uproar" is a song written by Paul Grady, and recorded by Canadian singer Anne Murray.  The song reached #18 on the Canadian Adult Contemporary chart in 1975.  The song appeared on her 1974 album, Highly Prized Possession.  The song was produced by Brian Ahern.

Chart performance

Anne Murray

References

1975 singles
1975 songs
Anne Murray songs
Song recordings produced by Brian Ahern (producer)
Capitol Records singles